Joey Dee and the Starliters  (also credited as Joey Dee and the Starlighters) is an American popular music group.  The group is best known for their million-selling recording "Peppermint Twist" (1961).
The group's most notable lineup is considered to be Joey Dee, David Brigati, Larry Vernieri (vocals), Carlton Lattimore (organ), Sam Taylor (guitar) and Willie Davis (drums). 
Jimi Hendrix and Joe Pesci played guitar with the group at different times in the 1960s.

Early singles
With lead singer Rogers Freeman, Joey Dee and the Starliters' first single was "Lorraine," backed with "The Girl I Walk To School," in 1958, distributed by the company Little.  That same year, Joey Dee recruited David Brigati for the team after meeting him during a gig at Garfield High School in New Jersey.  David and Joey would subsequently share lead vocal honors for the Starliters, with Joey ultimately becoming the primary lead singer.  Another early single for the group was "Face of an Angel," with David as lead vocal, released on Scepter Records; the flipside was "Shimmy Baby."  An album entitled The Peppermint Twisters and credited to "Joey Dee and the Starlighters" was subsequently released by the company Scepter as well.

The 1960s
In 1960, the Starliters were noticed by agent Don Davis while performing at a Lodi, New Jersey, nightclub called Oliveri's. The group was booked at an intimate venue on 45th Street in New York City called the Peppermint Lounge for what was supposed to be a one-time weekend gig. During their initial appearance at the nightclub, actress Merle Oberon and Prince Serge Oblinski were dancing much of the night there, which was reported the next morning by columnists Earl Wilson and Cholly Knickerbocker.  The next night, it took barricades and mounted police to keep the crowds in line, which had backed to Broadway, and for several months thereafter, the craze continued at the Lounge. Celebrity visitors, such as Judy Garland, John Wayne, Jackie Kennedy, Nat "King" Cole, Shirley MacLaine, Tennessee Williams, Truman Capote, and Liberace, continued to make an appearance.  Dee and company were such a sensation that they became the house band for the Peppermint Lounge for over a year. Dee wrote "Peppermint Twist," along with producer Henry Glover, as a tribute to the lounge and the song scored #1 on the U.S. charts in early 1962. It sold over one million copies, and was awarded a gold disc.  By this time the team had contracted with Roulette Records.

In 1961, Joey Dee and the Starliters filmed the movie Hey, Let's Twist, starring Jo Ann Campbell and Teddy Randazzo, for Paramount Pictures.  Hey, Let's Twist was a fictional story of Joey Dee (Randazzo and Dino DiLuca played the parts of Joey's brother and father, respectively) and the Peppermint Lounge; its release capitalized on the current twist craze and made the once-obscure Lounge famous. The movie and soundtrack album did their part in making the Peppermint Lounge a world-famous venue. Successful singles spawned from Hey, Let's Twist were the title track and "Shout, Part I", which became the group's second-biggest selling record, reaching #6 on the U.S. charts. It also sold a million copies, giving the group their second gold disc. Other albums released during this time were Doin' The Twist at the Peppermint Lounge, which was recorded live at the venue, and All The World's Twistin' With Joey Dee & the Starliters (1961).

In 1962, Joey Dee and the Starliters starred in their second motion picture, Two Tickets to Paris, along with Gary Crosby, Jeri Lynne Fraser and Kay Medford. One of the songs from this film, "What Kind Of Love Is This," written by Johnny Nash, was released in September of that year and scored Top Twenty.  In December 1962, the original Starliters did their final recording session as a group, producing "Help Me Pick Up the Pieces," also composed by Nash, and "Baby, You're Driving Me Crazy," written by Joey Dee and Henry Glover.  In 1963, Joey Dee recorded an album entitled Dance, Dance, Dance, with the Ronettes as his backup group. During spring of that year, Roulette released the track "Hot Pastrami with Mashed Potatoes", from the previously issued live album, as a two-part single; the record made the U.S. Top Forty. Roulette later released "Ya Ya" and "Fannie Mae" from the same album. Also in 1963, former Mersey Beat editor Bill Harry quotes in his Sleeve notes for the 2004 CD The Early Tapes Of The Beatles that the group were the backing Band on the Tony Sheridan track Ruby Baby, though this has not been verified by any members. The track has been widely reissued on Various versions of the Beatles Hamburg Recordings. During October and November 1963, the Starliters toured Europe, performing one extraordinary night in Stockholm with The Beatles (already the biggest band in Northern Europe) as their opening act.  In 1964, Joey Dee toured with various Starliters, including future Young Rascals Gene Cornish, Felix Cavaliere, and David's brother, Eddie Brigati.

Jimi Hendrix and Joe Pesci played guitar with the group at different times in the 1960s.

Later history
Dee continued to record and issue solo recordings from the mid-1960s to the mid-1970s, including a song he wrote with original Starliters David Brigati and Larry Vernieri entitled "How Can I Forget", which was released under the name Joey Dee and the New Starliters. He continued to travel and make personal appearances with various Starliters.

In 2001 the group was featured on a PBS special, Rock, Rhythm and Doo-Wop, and in 2005 they appeared on the Jerry Lewis telethon for muscular dystrophy.

As of 2009 Joey Dee and the Starliters consists of Dee sometimes performing with Bobby Valli (brother of Frankie Valli) and original Starliter David Brigati and at other times with the original Soul Survivors Charlie and Richie Ingui, with the three singers taking the lead and performing their own hits as well as covers. Joey's son Ronnie DiNicola often plays saxophone and sings backup vocals for his father. 

Dee has been a long time resident of Pinellas County in Florida. 

On September 19, 2010, a street corner was dedicated to the band in their home town of Passaic, NJ. The street signing took place on the corner of Washington Place and Columbia Ave.

In 2021, Joey Dee released his long-awaited autobiography entitled Peppermint Twist Chronicles: My True Story of Sex, Rock n’ Roll, Jimi Hendrix, Fighting Racism, and the Mob. Dee’s memoirs were co-written by J. Kevin Morris. When the book was released, it became one of the top selling music history books on Amazon.

Members

Discography

Albums

 Doin' the Twist at the Peppermint Lounge (Roulette, 1961)
 Hey Let's Twist (Roulette, 1961)
 All The World Is Twistin'! (Roulette, 1962)
 Two Tickets To Paris (Roulette, 1962)
 Back At The Peppermint Lounge (Roulette, 1962)
 Hey Let's Twist!: The Best Of Joey Dee & The Starliters (Rhino, 1990)

Singles

References

External links
 
 Joey Dee – interview
 Starlighters biography

American pop music groups
Jubilee Records artists
Musical groups from New Jersey
Roulette Records artists